Lale Orta (born 1960) is a Turkish former football player, coach, sports commentator and referee. She was Turkey's first ever FIFA listed woman referee. Currently, she is an academic in the field of sports science. End January 2023, she was appointed chairperson of the Central Referee Committee of the Turkish Football Federation.

Personal life 
Lale Orta was born 1960 in Istanbul. Following her primary and secondary education in schools at Aksaray, Cibali and Bakırköy, she studied Accounting and Finance at Marmara University graduating in 1986. She continued her higher education in Sport management at the same university and earned a Master's degree in 1993. She received a Ph.D. degree with a thesis on "Football Organizations in Turkey and the World - An Analytical Approach" at her alma mater in 2002.

Between 1998 and 2003, Orta served as lecturer at the Istanbul Technical University. From 2003 to 2009, she taught at Çanakkale Onsekiz Mart University. Since then she has been employed by Okan University in Istanbul, first as an assistant professor and as an associate professor starting in 2015, and has acted as the head of the Department of Sports Management between 2009-2011 and 2015 onwards.

Lale Orta is married to film and stage actor Ahmet Orta.

Sports career

Player and coach 
Between 1976 and 1989, she played football as goalkeeper in Dostluk Spor, the first women's football team of Turkey, and served as its captain. She became later the country's first female certified football coach, and worked as such for Dostluk Spor and the Turkey women's national football team.

Referee 
Orta began her referee career as an assistant referee in a match of the Turkish reserve team league, called A2 Ligi, on September 10, 1990. She made her debut as a referee in the same league on October 7, 1990. She was then promoted to officiate in the TFF Third League on October 27, 1990, and in the TFF Second League on January 28, 1996. Orta was appointed to supervise the highest-level Turkish league competitions in the Süper Lig for the first time in the match Sakaryaspor against MKE Ankaragücü on May 29, 1999. She served as referee in the Turkish Women's First Football League debuting on April 9, 2000. After officiating more than 1,500 amateur and professional football matches including 60 international in various competitions, she retired from active referee career in domestic football after her last match on December 5, 2004. The Turkish Football Federation named her official observer for the Super Lig matches with effect of the 2007–08 season.

In 1995, she received the FIFA badge as one of the first 54 women referees from 27 countries in the world. In this capacity, she officiated international matches in eleven years. Orta was named a "UEFA Elite Referee" among 17 European referees in 2003. On November 28, 2002, Orta supervised the quarter-finals match between Arsenal Ladies and CSK VVS Samara at the 2002–03 UEFA Women's Cup held in St Albans England. She oversaw the preliminary round match between Russia and France at the 2005 UEFA Women's Championship qualification in Moscow, Russia on May 16, 2004  and the final match of 2005 UEFA Women's Cup between the German 1. FFC Turbine Potsdam and the Swedish Djurgårdens IF Dam on May 15, 2005. Due to 45-years of age limit for referees set by the FIFA, Orta's international referee career ended after the 2007 FIFA Women's World Cup qualification (UEFA) match she officiated between the national women's teams of Spain and Belgium played in Madrid, Spain on November 5, 2005. For the 2007–08 UEFA Women's Cup semifinal second-leg match between the Italian A.S.D. C.F. Bardolino Verona and the German 1. FFC Frankfurt teams played in Verona, Italy on April 5, 2008, she served as the official observer.

Sports administrator 
Orta was appointed chairperson of the Central Referee Committee (MHK) of the Turkish Football Federation on 29 January 2023.

Honors 
 March 26, 2002 IOC trophy "Women and Sport in Europe"
 2003 UEFA Elite Referee

References 

Living people
1960 births
Footballers from Istanbul
Turkish women's footballers
Women's association football goalkeepers
Association football commentators
Turkish women's football managers
Turkish football referees
Turkish sportswomen
Marmara University alumni
Academic staff of Istanbul Technical University
Academic staff of Çanakkale Onsekiz Mart University
Academic staff of Istanbul Okan University
Sportspeople from Istanbul
Turkish female association football managers
Women association football referees
20th-century Turkish sportswomen
Turkish sports executives and administrators
Association football executives